George Robert Fissler (October 13, 1906 – December 18, 1975) was an American competition swimmer who represented the United States at the 1932 Summer Olympics in Los Angeles, California.  Fissler won a silver medal as a member of the second-place U.S. team in the men's 4×200-meter freestyle relay, together with teammates Frank Booth, Maiola Kalili and Manuella Kalili.

See also
 List of Olympic medalists in swimming (men)

External links
 

1906 births
1975 deaths
American male freestyle swimmers
Olympic silver medalists for the United States in swimming
Swimmers at the 1932 Summer Olympics
Medalists at the 1932 Summer Olympics